The following is a list of original programs of Prima televize network.

Series 
 1. mise (2021–2022)
 3 + 1 z Jetelína (2018)
 Aféry (2011)
 Agrometal (TBA)
 Bazén (2005)
 Bodyguardi (2023-current)
 Cesty domů (2010–2015)
 Černé vdovy (Since 2019)
 Dobré zprávy (Since 2022)
 Duch (2022)
 Dvojka na zabití (2021)
 Einstein – Případy nesnesitelného génia (Since 2021)
 Hořký svět (2022)
 Hvězdy nad hlavou (2021)
 Jetelín (2016–2018)
 Kapitán Exner (2017)
 Krejzovi (2018–2019)
 Křižovatky života (2013–2015)
 Letiště (2006–2007)
 Linka (2019)
 Modrý kód (2017–2020)
 Mordparta (2016–2017)
 Na vlnách Jadranu (TBA)
 O mé rodině a jiných mrtvolách (2011)
 Obchoďák (2012)
 Ohnivý kuře (2016–2018)
 Ošklivka Katka (2008–2009)
 Pálava (2022)
 Po hlavě (2020)
 Polda (Since 2016)
 Přešlapy (2009–2010)
 Přístav (2015-2017)
 Poslední oběť (TBA)
 Půlnoční zpověď (2023)
 Rodinka (2011)
 Rodinná pouta (2004-2006)
 Sedm schodů k moci (2023)
 Sestřičky (2020–2021)
 Slunečná (2020–2022)
 Svatby v Benátkách (2014–2015)
 Tátové na tahu (2018)
 Temný kraj (2017–2019)
 V.I.P. vraždy (2016–2018)
 Velmi křehké vztahy (2007–2009)
 Vinaři (2014–2015)
 Všechny moje lásky (2015–2016)
 Základka (2012)
 Zákony vlka (Since 2023)
 Zázraky života (2010–2012)
 Zoo (Since 2022)

Quiz shows 
 Ber nebo neber
 Milionář

Award shows
 Mattoni Koktejl Festival

News 
 Krimi zprávy
 Hlavní zprávy
 Showtime
 Počasí

Reality shows 
 Bar
 Vyvolení
 Zlatá maska

Publicistic shows 
 Prima Svět (Since 1995)
 Autosalon.tv (Since 2005)
 Partie (Since 2005)
 Cesty k úspěchu(Since 2011)
 Cyklosalon.tv (Since 2021)
 Fotr na tripu (Since 2021)

Comedial shows 
 Inkognito
 Máme rádi Česko
 Nečum na mě show
 Můj muž to dokáže
 Prima Partička
 Telebazar

Talent shows
 X Factor

Talk show 
 Show Jana Krause
 7 pádů Honzy Dědka
 Jednou jsi dole, jednou nahoře
 QI

Other shows
 Policie v akci

References

Prima